Toro Negro State Forest (Spanish: Bosque Estatal de Toro Negro) is one of the 21 forests that make up the public forests system in Puerto Rico. It is also Puerto Rico's highest cloud forest. Nested among these mountains is Lake Guineo, the island's highest lake. The forest has  of trails, an observation tower, two natural swimming pools (Spanish:"charcos"), camping and picnic areas, nine rivers, and numerous creeks and waterfalls. The forest spans areas within the municipalities of Ponce, Jayuya, Orocovis, Ciales, and Juana Díaz, and consists of seven non-contiguous tracts of land. The largest contiguous segment of the forest is located in the municipalities of Ponce and Jayuya. Some 40% of the area of Toro Negro State Forest is located in Ponce's Barrio Anón.

When created in 1935 as part of the Caribbean National Forest, the Toro Negro Forest Reserve was managed by the United States government, first via the Puerto Rico Reconstruction Administration of the Department of the Interior (1935–1942) and later through the Forest Service of the Department of Agriculture (1942–1970). Then, in 1970, the Federal Government exchanged with the Government of the Commonwealth of Puerto Rico the Toro Negro section of the Caribbean National Forest for some forested lands belonging to the Commonwealth and located adjacent to the much larger federal lands at Luquillo National Forest resulting in the creation at Luquillo of the current El Yunque National Forest. In 1970, the Government of Puerto Rico's Departmento de Recursos Naturales y Ambientales (DRNA) opened the Toro Negro Forest Reserve as a Commonwealth state forest and renamed it Bosque Estatal de Toro Negro (Toro Negro State Forest).

History

In 1876, Spanish King Alfonso XII of Spain issued the first proclamation for the creation of forest reserves in Puerto Rico. The land where Toro Negro sits was originally used for coffee plantations until the 1930s when a program of reforestation was commenced.

In 1934, those lands were acquired by the Puerto Rico Reconstruction Administration (PRRA). In 1935,  of private lands were purchased by the PRRA. The forest was not a separate entity at the time; it was part of the Caribbean National Forest, and was administered by the U.S. Forest Service as the Toro Negro Division of the Caribbean National Forest. Twenty-eight species were planted in twenty-nine different plantations. In 1942, the US Department of the Interior transferred the forest to the United States Department of Agriculture. From 1942 to 1961, it was administered by the US Forest Service. During these years, the U.S. Department of Agriculture continued its acquisition of lands increasing the acreage of Toro Negro.
 

In 1961, Toro Negro was transferred to the Government of Puerto Rico. Of these ,  were exchanged for  located adjacent to the Luquillo Unit of the Caribbean National Forest. The remaining  were ceded to Puerto Rico's Department of Agriculture for forestry purposes. This resulted in the Toro Negro State Forest. Since 1962, approximately 120 cuerdas have been planted to eucalyptus, mahoe, kadam  and Honduran pine. In 1962, Toro Negro had , representing 11.32% of Puerto Rico's state forests. In 1962 the Area Recreacional Doña Juana was added to Toro Negro. In April 1970, a land exchange which included the Puerto Rico Department of Agriculture purchase and transfer of  forest lands adjacent to Luquillo Experimental Forest in exchange for the complete transfer of Toro Negro forest lands to the Commonwealth of Puerto Rico.

The lower elevations of Toro Negro used to be important coffee-producing plantations, however, the entire forest is especially critical for water and soil conservation. Today, the amount of tree foliage coverage in the forest ranges from 81% in the moist forest zone to 99% in the lower montane wet forest zone. The forest was named for the Río Toro Negro, one of nine rivers that flow out of the forest, and the name of one of the barrios in the Ciales portion of the forest.

Protected area

Toro Negro is a protected area under the law.  The forest has a protected status of "IV" ("Protected Area with sustainable use of natural resources") according to the International Union for Conservation of Nature (IUCN) convention. Ecological protection is managed and enforced by the Puerto Rico Department of Natural and Environmental Resources.

Through the parcelero (from the Spanish root for "parcel", or land lot) program, people who were living in the lands being incorporated into the reserve during the federal government land acquisitions of 1935 were allowed to stay in their places when forest protection went into effect.

In January 1999, a bill in the Puerto Rico House of Representatives sought to increase the size of the protected area by unifying the Toro Negro, Guilarte, and Pueblo de Adjuntas State Forests.  In a March 2008 study by its International Institute of Tropical Forestry (IITF), the U.S. Department of Agriculture classified Toro Negro State Forest as a Commonwealth of Puerto Rico forest of "Status 2", s status it defines as "an area having permanent protection from conversion of natural land cover and a mandated management plan in operation to maintain a primarily natural state, but which may receive use or management practices that degrade the quality of existing natural communities".  As of 2013, there were ongoing governmental initiatives in place to acquire, from private owners, additional lands adjacent to the Toro Negro State Forest to increase the protected area of the forest as well as to create a wildlife forest corridor that would join Toro Negro with the nearby Tres Picachos and Guilarte state forests through plans such as the federal Forest Legacy Areas initiative.

Location
It is located in remote areas of the Cordillera Central mountain range. The forest office is at km. 32.4 of Route PR-143, east of the intersection with Route PR-149. The forest distribution encompasses a range from 18°07'30" N and 18°15'00" N to 66°30'00" W and 66°37'30" W. The forest ranger's office and visitors' area are located on Puerto Rico Highway 143 Km 32.4 in Barrio Ala de la Piedra, Orocovis at 18.17342°N, 66.49231°W. The largest sections of the forest are located in the municipalities of Ponce and Jayuya, both of which are municipalities in the Puerto Rico Tourism Company's Porta Caribe tourism zone.

Forest types

Four vegetation associations have been delineated in two bioclimatic life zones.  The two climatic biome zones are: the subtropical moist forest life zone (31% of the forest) and the lower mountain wet forest life zone (the remaining 69% of the forest). The topography is accentuated by a large number of steep slopes and high waterfalls.  Toro Negro subforests are catalogued on the basis of their elevation and content. From Cerro Maravilla, one of the tallest peaks in the forest, four of Puerto Rico's distinct forest types can be seen: Bosque Tabonuco, Bosque Micropholis Buchenavia, Bosque Sierra de Palmas, and Bosque enano.

Bosque Tabonuco forest
The Tabonuco forest has many of the characteristics for which tropical rain forests are noted. The forest canopy has three levels: an upper level that may be as much as 35% Tabonuco, a lower canopy, and an under story. The second most prominent tree in this forest type, the Montillo (Sloanea berteroana), has large buttress roots, typical of many rain forest trees. Such roots help support the heavy canopy of large trees growing in very wet soil. The forest floor is only scarcely vegetated, but the forest canopy is rich with aerial plants: bromeliads, orchids, vines, and arboreal ferns. The tabonuco type dominates in the subtropical wet life zone.

Bosque Micropholis Buchenavia forest
Above  is the Bosque Micropholis Buchenavia forest. Micropholis and Buchenavia (Granadillo) are the dominant species in this lower montane zonal vegetation association.

Sierra de Palmas forest
At about the same elevation as the Bosque Micropholis Buchenavia forest (above ), but on very steep slopes, are the Sierra de Palmas forests dominated by the sierra palm (Prestoea montana). Sometimes called palm-breaker, this forest type may reach  in height. The Sierra de Palmas covers the largest area of all forest types in Toro Negro. The palm forest is distinguishable at a great distance by the form and size of leaves and by the general pale green color of the foliage. Below  elevation the palms appear as scattered elements; however at higher elevations the sierra palm becomes a dominant species over a large area. The palm forest, nearly always a single species dominant is normally open and free from undergrowth of any kind. The globose fruits are somewhat more than one centimeter in diameter and produced in great abundance.

Bosque Enano forest
At the highest elevations, near the top of Cerro de Punta, Cerro Maravilla and similar peaks, grows the Bosque enano forest, also known as dwarf forest, cloud forest, elfin forest and moss forest. This forest type is composed of very dense stands of small, stunted trees and shrubs. The cloud forest has many of the same tree species as the Bosque Micropholis Buchenavia forest, but growth is limited by adverse climate—heavy rain, strong winds, and almost constant cloud cover.

The dwarf or cloud forest developed in the higher peaks of the Central Cordillera is quite different in general appearance from the cloud forest of Sierra Luquillo Mountains due to the less rigorous environment in Toro Negro. The physical effect of the wind is much reduced; the shrubs are neither bent nor shorn to an even surface, but are essentially erect and their crowns are rounded and uneven in outline. The mosses are reduced to a thin mantle on the more sheltered trunks and are absent in many places, while the great mats of Selaginella are completely lacking.

In the Toro Negro forest, only the most inaccessible mountain tops have never been cleared. Most of the lower areas are subject to the familiar routine of logging, clearing, burning, and grazing or semi-permanent cultivation. Most of the forest lands in Toro Negro rise above the upper limit of successful coffee cultivation.

Geology
Toro Negro State Forest has both deep soils and surface soils. Deep soils are derived from volcanic igneous rock, fine-grained. These contain high amounts of permeable clay, low amounts of sand, silt, and high amounts of iron and aluminum, but little silica. The surface soils are acidic and brittle while the subsoil is acidic and heavy, but permeable. Its hills are mostly steep. Usually the top soil is lost by erosion.

There are nine rivers that flow south (Río Indalecia, Río Guayo, Río Inabón, Río Blanco, Río Anón and Río Prieto), and three that flow north (Río Saliente, Río Toro Negro, and Río Matrullas) from the forest. The Matrullas and Guineo reservoirs are also part of the forest. Río Toro Negro - after which the forest is named - separates the municipalities of Ciales and Orocovis; it also forms Lago El Guineo. The forest's other lake, Lago Matrullas, is accessible via Puerto Rico Highway 564, which can be accessed via PR-143, in the municipality of Orocovis.

Flora

Toro Negro has four vegetation associations catalogued into two subtropical moist life zones: The first is a Subtropical Moist Zone (Zona Muy Húmeda Subtropical) and consists of the Tabonuco forest (Bosque de Tabonuco). The second is the Lower Mountain Wet Zone (Zona Muy Húmeda Montaña Abajo). This zone consists of three sub forests: the Micropholis Buchenavia forest (Bosque Micropholis Buchenavia), the Mountain Palm forest (Bosque de Palma de Sierra), and the Dwarf forest (Bosque Enano).

E. L. Little and F. H. Wadsworth reported a total of 160 tree species distributed amongst 53 families. The largest families are: Melastomaceae (16 species), Lauraceae (11 species) and Myrtaceae (10 species).

Ferns and orchids are abundant. Forty of the species found in this forest are endemic to Puerto Rico and thirteen are introduced species. The fern Thelypteris inabonensis, endemic to this forest and found only at the headwaters of Rio Inabon and at the Toro Negro's Cerro Rosa in Ciales, has been identified by the U.S. Fish and Wildlife Service as an endangered species.

Some of the more common trees are: tabonuco (Dacryodes excelsa), ausubo (Manilkara bidentata), jagüilla (Magnolia portoricensis), nuez moscada (Ocotea moschata), granadillo (Buchenavia capitata), maga (Montezuma speciosissima), higüerillo (Vitex divaricata), almedrón (Prunus occidentalis) and jácana (Pouteria multiflora). In addition Palmas de sierra (Prestoea montana) and helechos arbóreos (Cyathea Sp.) are very abundant. Some of the species that were introduced to this forest are mahoe (Hibiscus elatus Sw.), caoba hondureña (Swietenia macrophylla), pino hondureño (Pinus caribaea), eucalipto (Eucalyptus robusta) and kadam (Anthocephalus chinensis).

Ilex cookii, commonly known as Cook's Holly or te, is a small evergreen holly shrub known to exist only in the Toro Negro State Forest and only in extremely limited amounts. It is listed as a critically endangered species by the IUCN and protected by law.

Between 1935 and 1943, 28 species of trees were planted in Toro Negro. Their plantings (either via seeding or via planting of saplings) consisted of both native and exotic species. Nineteen native species were planted as follows (the quantity planted/seeded is shown after the species; and X means experimental planting only):
 Buchenavia tetraphylla, 200 
 Ocotea spathulata, 1,000
 Calophyllum calaba, 52,990 
 Petitia domingensis, 9,200
 Cedrela odorata, 499,526 
 Podocarpus coreacius, X
 Cordia alliodora, 553,892 
 Pouteria multiflora, 2,963,736
 Dacryodes excelsa, 22,375 
 Prunus occidentales, X
 Eugenia stahlii, 6,500 
 Sideroxylon foetidissimum, 2,098
 Guarea guidonia, 109,351 
 Tabebuia heterophylla, 12,400
 Hymenaea courbaril, 14 
 Thespesia grandiflora, 141,885
 Manilkara bidentata, 3,500 
 Vitex divaricada, 195,874
 Ocotea moschata, 71,131

The nine exotic species were:
 Bambusa vulgaris, 2,350 
 Pinus caribaea, X
 Cupressus lusitanica, X 
 Swietenia macrophylla, 764,436
 Eucalyptus spp., 158,910 
 Swietenia mahagoni, 35443
 Fraxinus uhdei, X
 Tectona grandis, 850
 Hibiscus elatus, X

Fauna

There are 30 species of birds reported, including 6 endemic species and two that are endangered: the Puerto Rican sharp-shinned hawk (Vernacular Spanish: Falcón de sierra; Taxonomy: Accipiter striatus venator) and Puerto Rican broad-winged hawk (Vernacular Spanish: Guaragüao de bosque; Taxonomy: Buteo platypterus brunnescens). The Puerto Rican parrot (Vernacular Spanish: Cotorra puertorriqueña; Taxonomy: Amazona vittata), a critically endangered species, has also been seen in this forest.

Recent studies have identified eight species of bats. They are most visible at dusk as this is when these nocturnal critters are out foraging for food, primarily mosquitoes. The 13 species of bats living in the forest play an important ecological role in controlling mosquitoes, which not only carry diseases but also harass hikers. The three most prevalent bat species are the greater bulldog bat, Antillean ghost-faced bat and the sooty mustached bat.

There are 20 species of reptiles and amphibians and, with the exception of Bufo marinus (Spanish: Sapo común), all are endemic. Reptiles include the Lagarto verde (Anolis cuvieri), lagartijo pigmeo (Anolis occultus), and boa de Puerto Rico (Chilabothrus inornatus), which is in danger of extinction; amphibians include the siguana (Ameiva exsul) and the culebra ciega (Amphisbaena caeca). Amphibians include coquí común (Eleutherodactylus coqui) and the coquí de la montaña (Eleutherodactylus portoricensis), a species denominated as vulnerable under Puerto Rico Law 6766. The Small Asian mongoose (Vernacular Spanish: Mangosta pequeña asiática; Taxonomy: Herpestes javanicus), has also been spotted inhabiting this forest.

Toro Negro State Forest is home to 11 species of snakes, all non-venomous to humans. It is a heavy-bodied snake with tan to dark brown body color and dark blotches down its back. It will defend itself with a bite, but kills its prey by suffocation. It is a protected species due to over-harvesting to collect oil and skins. It is nocturnal and prefers to remain under cover during the day and hunt at night. It slinks around in the trees of the Toro Negro Forest. His body sports a solid brown color with each of his scales edged by a darker brown. Like the forest's other various garden snakes, it is a daytime hunter. The forest also features blind snakes. They spend nearly their entire lives underground but do sometimes take cover under rotting trees. They do not bite as they do not have teeth.

Its rivers and lakes are home to several species of fish and crustaceans.  Fish found here include Dajao (Vernacular English: Mountain Mullet; Taxonomy: Agonostomus monticola) and Olivo (Sicydium plumieri), also known as Ceti. Some crustaceans are the camarón bocu (Macrobrachium crenulatum), gata (Atya lanipes), and buruquena (Epilobocera sinuatifrons), all endemic to Puerto Rico.

Facilities
With the exception of the Salto de Doña Juana waterfall, all of the forest facilities, including all trails, are located within the municipality of Orocovis and they are collectively known as the Doña Juana Recreational Area. Guided tours are available or visitors explore on their own. Ziplining is also a common activity in the Toro Negro forest. The forest office, staffed by personnel from the Puerto Rico Department of Natural and Environmental Resources, provides maps of the forest and its trails and services, weather conditions information, and mud slides danger levels. Among the facilities available at Toro Negro are a camping area, a recreational area, a system of hiking trails and observation points.

Trails
Officially there are 10 hiking trails covering . They are provided for hiking as well as to facilitate bird and landscape watching, meditation, and similar activities.  While the official number of trails is stated as 10, some of the trails are actually dirt roads for park ranger vehicles. Also, some of the "trails" require the hiker to walk a segment on a paved Commonwealth road or county road. Trails are generally quite wide, but being a forest in mountains with high humidity and rain precipitation, many of the trails are muddy in at least some areas. Hikers are often seen with walking sticks, which help maintain balance when walking on slippery surfaces, particularly the algae-covered ground rocks present on some of the trails. Some of the trails lead to or run near charcos. Charcos are natural swimming pools (swimming holes).  The Toro Negro State Forest office is the starting point for several of the trails. However, most of the trails are not well marked, nor are they well kept, so they can be hard to locate and to follow in the dense forest.  Under an agreement with the government of Puerto Rico, the municipality of Orocovis is the entity responsible for trail maintenance. The 10 official trails are:

Key to icons:
   – Indicates a Hiking trail area
   – Indicates Camping area
   – Indicates a Picnic area
   – Indicates Diving or Snorkeling area
   – Indicates Fishing area
   – Indicates Swimming area
   – Indicates a Lookout tower
   – Indicates Visitors' Center

Trail #1 ("El Bolo")
It is a low challenge trail. It is essentially a loop that starts at the visitors' parking area on PR-143 and terminates on PR-143 about 1/4 mile north of the visitors' parking area, from where hikers simply walk the road back to the parking area. Starting off at the visitors' parking area, hikers cross PR-143 to head south on the trail. This section of the forest has many banana trees and flowers along its way and starts off with a steep uphill climb. Approximately  into the trail, the trail starts to head East and flattens out as it becomes a rocky at first and then grassy further on. Another  heading East the trail connects to Trail #6 which leads to the swimming pool. Continuing East another , the trail becomes uphill again as it connects to the northernmost point of a paved road, Puerto Rico Highway 561, on the right hand side. From this point on the trail starts to head North on a downhill grade but in less than  it connects to Trail #3 which leads to the Observation Tower, where there is a sign that reads La Torre ("The Tower"). The trail continuous downhill North-Northwest about  until it reaches paved road PR-143, in the vicinity of km 32.6. From this point hikers make a left to walk southwest bound on PR-143 (that is, "West" on PR-143) until reaching the visitors' area at km 32.4.

Trail #3 (Observation Tower)
This trail leads to the Observation Tower. This trail if for advanced hikers. Trail #3 does not start at the visitors' parking area, so hikers must first hike on other trails to get to Trail #3.  Starting from the visitors' parking area, there are three ways to get to Trail #3. Path Option 1: This is the shortest route. Hikers get on PR-143, walking northeast bound (that is, making a left from the parking area to head "East" on PR-143) about 0.25 miles, make a right into the forest at the sign ("Verada #6 - Piscina") to get on Trail #6, hike the 0.8 mile of Trail #6 to its end, make a left into Trail #1 and hike about 0.3 mile to the beginning of Trail #3. Path Option 2: This is the second shortest route. Hikers take Trail #1 as described above under section "Trail #1" until they reach Trail #3 where there is a sign that reads "Observation Tower".  Path Option 3: This is the longest route. Hikers head northeast bound (that is, "East" on PR-143) passed the sign stating "Trail #6 - La Piscina (this will be about 0.25 mile hike), and continue northeast bound for approximately another 0.25 mile until the sign stating "Trail #1 - Camino Bolo where hikers make a right into the forest and continue this trail about 0.9 mile until coming to Trail #3.

Once on Trail #3, hikers climb this trail about 0.6 miles to its top where the observation tower is located.  The trail to the observation tower lookout hill is not for the faint of heart. It is very steep and very slippery. It is a one-way trail (in the sense that the same trail is used in the return trip) and the trail feels even more slippery in the downhill return hike. This trail is made of rocks but, because of the high humidity and low traffic, algae have overtaken the rocks to make the trail very slippery. Walking around the rocks does not always help as the area is muddy - though albeit less slippery. The view and fresh air and breeze make the trek quite rewarding. The views are unobstructed and panoramic 360° views are possible. The tower is 3,537 feet above sea level. Altogether the distance from the visitors' parking area to the tower is 2.14 miles.

Trail #5 ("Las Cuarenta")
Trail #5 is about 0.9 mile long and is a medium challenge trail. There is a significant amount of mud on this trail, but less so in the dry season months of December through March and June through July. To reach this trail from the visitors' parking area hikers must first head northbound to trek the entire length of Trail #7 (the Camping Area trail, 0.1 mile long), cross the bridge over the Doña Juana Creek and then hop on Trail #8. From this point on Trail #8, hikers head West for about 0.2 mile where Trail #5 begins; its entrance is located on the right hand side. The trail heads North and leads to Puerto Rico Highway 564. The first segment of the trail runs downhill for 0.9 mile.  The trail runs a thick tropical jungle of banana trees, sierra palms, tree ferns, flamboyant trees, and elephant ears. The trail is muddy, steep, and scantily-marked. Visibility is minimal through the dense foliage. There are several creeks near this trail and birds are abundant: black-throated blue warblers, northern parulas, green mangos, Cape May warblers, belted kingfishers, among others. After the 0.9 mile trek, the trail reaches PR-564. There is water pumping station on the left. From this point the "trail" turns right, as PR-564 is intended to be part of the trail. Hikers walk South on PR-564 for 0.6 mile where the northern terminus of Trail #9 (the Doña Petra trail) is located to the right. Continuing southbound on PR-564 for another 0.1 mile, the road trail meets PR-143, where hikers turn right to continue South on Trail #5. From this point hikers walk another 0.25 mile to arrive at the visitors' parking area on the right side of the road. Considering the hikes on Trails #7 and #8 plus the hikes on roads PR-564 and PR-143, Trail #5 is 2.95 miles long, making it the second longest hike of all of Toro Negro's trails.

Trail #6 (The Pool)
This trail is about 0.5 miles long and a low challenge trail. The trail is well maintained, but the natural pool that it leads to is open during summer months only. Starting from the visitors' parking area, hikers get on PR-143 walking northeast bound (that is, making a left from the parking area to head "East" on PR-143) about 0.25 miles, then make a right into the forest at the sign ("Verada #6 - Piscina") to get on Trail #6. This trail runs along a river for about 1/4 mile before it comes to the sign "Piscina" pointing left. Continuing south on the trail, there are two eye-catching waterfalls visible from the trail. Continuing southbound and uphill, the trail goes through two flat and open areas with picnic tables. After this, the trail continues uphill and southbound for about 0.6 miles where it comes to its end, reaching Trail #1. Once at Trail #1, hikers either make a left or a right to get onto Trail #1 (trail #1 is a loop trail) or, of course, may turn around to return to the parking area via Trail #6. The entire length of Trail #6 is 0.8 miles.

Trail #7 (Camping Area)
This trail is actually a paved forest road leading to the Los Viveros camping area, Toro Negro State Forest's only campground. It is located north of the parking area.  The "trail" is only 0.1 mile long, wide and flat, thus a low challenge trail. The trail is also the connecting trail to Trail #8, which leads to Charco La Confesora (see below). Another use of this trail is that it leads to one of the forest's three official picnic areas. Its picnic area is the one closes to the visitors' parking area. The Doña Juana Creek runs next to the picnic area.

Trail #8 ("Charco La Confesora")
This trail is 0.54 mile long, it is a medium challenge trail, and leads to El Charco ("The Pond"), a natural swimming hole. It is located north of the parking area, and starts at the end of Trail #7. After hiking north from the parking area on Trail #7 (Trail #7 is a 0.1 mile long paved road), and hiking by the camping area, Trail #7 comes to an end at the Doña Juana Creek. There is a sign pointing West (Charco Confesora) near the picnic area next to the camping area that serves as a landmark. At this point hikers walk over a little bridge to cross the creek, where Trail #8 begins. The trail heads northwest along the creek (the creek is located to the left of the trail) and the trail is abundant with wild flowers. It is a downhill trail and a bit muddy. A section of the trail consists of concrete steps. At the end of the trail is Charco La Confesora, a natural "pool", with a waterfall as a backdrop. swimming is allowed at this charco. The return path is the same as the path to the charco as the trail terminates at the charco.

Trail #9 ("Doña Petra")
This trail is 0.4 mile long, it is a medium challenge trail. Like Trail #5, it is located north of the parking area, and starts where Trail #7 end. Also, like trail #5, there is a significant amount of mud on this trail, though less so during the dry season months of December through March and June through July. To reach this trail from the visitors' parking area hikers must first head northbound to trek the entire length of Trail #7 (the Camping Area trail, 0.1 mile long) and cross the bridge over the Doña Juana Creek. Trail #9 begins at this bridge. Heading to the left from the bridge is the path for Trail #8, but heading straight up (northbound) gets hikers onto Trail #9, the Doña Petra Trail. (Like trail #5, the "Las Cuarenta" trail, Trail #9 will also bring the hiker to State Route PR-564, but being a shorter trail, it does not encounter PR-564 as far north as Trail #5 does.) The first segment of the trail runs downhill for 0.2 mile, where according to ranger office maps, there used to be a trail to the left (i.e., westbound) leading to Trail #5. However, vegetation apparently overran such connecting trail because it is no longer visible. The trail then continues another 0.2 mile where it reaches PR-564. From this point the "trail" turns right, as PR-564 is intended to be part of the trail. Hikers walk South on PR-564 for 0.1 mile where the "road trail" meets PR-143. At State Route PR-143 hikers turn right to continue South on Trail #9. From this point hikers walk another 0.25 mile to arrive at the visitors' parking area on the right side of the road. Considering the hikes on Trail #7 and roads PR-564 and PR-143, Trail #9 is 0.75 mile long.

Trails #2, #4, and #10
Trails #2, #4 and #10 are no longer active trails. Trail #2 was called Camino Ortolaza and was 0.5 mile long. It was a "one-way" trail (i.e., same entrance and exit) and ran from PR-143 to the Doña Juana Creek. It started on PR-143 some 0.25 mile west of the entrance to the Area Recreativa/visitors' parking area and headed North ending at the Doña Juana Creek, about 0.2 mile west of Charco La Confesora. Trail #4 was called Camino Vega Grande and was 0.4 mile long. It was another "one-way" trail and began on PR-143 about 0.1 mile east of the current Trail #1 eastern terminus. Trail #10 was called Camino El Tabonuco and was about 0.2 mile long. It was also a "one-way" trail. It originated at km 32.3 on PR-143 and headed north into the forest.

Trail #11 (T9-to-T5 Connector)
An unnamed trail, but referenced and marked in the DRNA maps, is a trail that could be termed Trail #11 for referential purposes. It was located midway on Trail #9 (that is, about 0.2 mile west of PR-546) and headed north to Trail #5. It met Trail #9 at a point about 0.2 mile west of PR-546. This trail was about 0.3 mile long. It served the double purpose of acting as a nature trail while at the same time it connected Trails 5 and 9, thus making for a shortcut from Trail #5 back to the car parking area via Trail #9. DRNA considers this unnamed trail a part of (an offshoot of) Trail #5.

Campgrounds

The campgrounds (camping area) at Toro Negro is called Los Viveros.  It is located on PR-143, Km 32.5.  Its coordinates are at 18.17502°N, 66.49202°W. Camping is available for a maximum of 35 people. Camping facilities include restrooms and showers. A permit is required for camping and they are purchased in advance, as there are no permit sales on premises.  In the proximity of the campgrounds there is also a picnic area. It has six picnic shelters with covered BBQ, on-site water, and a spot for a campfire.

Lakes and water sports
Lake El Guineo and Lake Matrullas are both man-made reservoirs. Fishing, boating and kayaking is allowed at the El Guineo and Matrullas reservoirs. Lake El Guineo is located at 18.1579°N 66.5284°W, at an altitude of 3,002 feet above sea level. It is located between the municipalities of Ciales and Orocovis, west of the Doña Juana Recreation Area, on PR-143 at km 25.4.  The lowest temperatures recorded on the Puerto Rico—some 40 °F (4 °C) -- were measured at Lake Guineo. Lake Matrullas is located at 18.2064°N 66.4798°W, at an altitude of 2,464 feet above sea level.  It too is between the municipalities of Ciales and Orocovis. It is located northeast of the Doña Juana Recreation Area, on PR-564 at km 6.1. The Puerto Rico DRNA allows the use of kayaks in Lake Matrullas. The ambiance is cool and misty. Both lakes are all well stocked with Peacock and Largemouth bass. Creeks are abundant in the area, and in addition to the Quebrada Doña Juana, the forest also has a number of other creeks, such as Quebrada Rosa.

Observation tower
The observation tower, accessible only on foot via Trail #3, rises at 3,537 feet above sea level, making it the highest manmade point on the island. The tower's coordinates are 18.17178°N, 66.48091°W. The tower is used for observation of the landscape surrounding Toro Negro and, on clear mornings before the afternoon clouds roll in, both the northern and southern shores of Puerto Rico are visible. San Juan is also visible as a distant haze in the northeastern horizon. The observation tower affords views Lake El Guineo and Lake Guayabal as well as the Caribbean Sea. It was built by the Spaniards during colonial times as a lookout tower to protect the south coast of the Island.

Charcos
Charcos are natural ponds, or swimming holes, formed by the mountain rivers as they fall as waterfalls onto the ground below. They are popular way of refreshing from the summer heat in the Toro Negro State Forest. The forest's "official" pool is accessed via Trail number 6, the La Piscina ("The Pool") trail. To reach trail 6, hikers start out from the forest office/parking area and hike north on route PR-143 about 1/4 mile. Trail 6 is located on the right hand side of the road. This pool is a river-fed pool. It became deteriorated, in disrepair and closed to public use sometime prior to 2010 and, in February 2013, there were unconfirmed reports that it had been repaired and reopen. In 2008, it was reported that an agreement between DNRA and the local community had been signed whereby the community would help repair the pool. Under an agreement with the government of Puerto Rico, the municipality of Orocovis is the entity responsible for pool maintenance. In any case, this pool opens only during the summer months. The pool's water temperature is very chilled, but refreshing, given the high humidity of the area, particularly in the afternoons. La Piscina is located at 18.1713°N 66.4876°W.

A second river-fed swimming pool charco is located at Charco La Confesora. It is about 15 x 25 feet large and deep enough to dive feet first.  This charco is accessed via Trail number 8, located at the end of Trail 7, the trail to the camping area. The pool at Charco La Confesora is located at 18.176901, -66.495861..

Cerro de Punta and other peaks

The forest includes Puerto Rico's highest peak, Cerro de Punta, which is located at km. 17.0 on Puerto Rico Highway 143. It is at 18.1722°N, 66.5917°W. The mountain is the dividing landmark for the municipalities of Ponce and Jayuya. The mountain is accessible by car but the road is quite steep and many prefer to walk the road (it is about half hour's hike to the top) unless riding on an all-wheel drive vehicle.  There is parking on PR-143 for those who prefer to walk to the hilltop.  Another peak in the Toro Negro is Cerro Maravilla, infamous due to the murders of two independentistas youth at the hand of police in an ambush. This peak is also accessible by car from PR-143. The road leading to the top of Cerro Maravilla is PR-577 and is not as steep as that to Cerro de Punta (the Cerro de Punta road has no state signing.) This road is also much shorter, about 0.5 kilometer total length. Cerro Maravilla is located at 18.1532°N, 66.5543°W.  Communications towers for radio, television, cellular and similar systems are located atop each of these peaks and armed security personnel, including police, is on the premises. However, private individuals can access both of these peaks.  Overall, the Forest contains Cerro Punta, Cerro Rosa and Cerro Jayuya, which are considered to be Puerto Rico's three highest peaks. Cerro Maravilla, Cerro El Bolo, and Cerro Doña Juana are also located within the Toro Negro Forest.

Nearby attractions

Doña Juana Falls

These falls (Spanish: Salto de Doña Juana) are about 200 feet tall. They are not located within the Toro Negro State Forest itself but they are near it, requiring visitors to drive 3.9 km westbound on route PR-143 from the Doña Juana Recreational Area to reach PR-149, then drive an additional 2.3 kilometers northbound on PR-149 (towards Ciales). The falls are on PR-149 at km 41.3. They are the tallest waterfalls in Puerto Rico. Their coordinates are 18.182836, -66.512257..

The falls are part of the Doña Juana Creek as it runs into Rio Toro Negro at the line that divides the municipalities of Ciales and Orocovis. The falls are very accessible, as they are viewable from the road as drivers cross the bridge of these falls. The falls fall next to the road on its eastern side and then run under the PR-149 bridge, to feed into Rio Toro Negro located a few yards on the western side of PR-149.

Villalba-Orocovis Lookout
This lookout position (known in Spanish as the Mirador Villalba-Orocovis or the Villalba-Orocovis Lookout) is located outside the Toro Negro State Forest but still on PR-143 (km 39.8) and a short distance from the forest, and it is a popular stop over for visitors to the forest. It contains picnic areas, restroom facilities and various trails. It is located at 18°10'37"N, 66°27'0"W, that is, 7.4 kilometers east of Toro Negro State Forest's Doña Juana Recreational Area.

Climate
The Toro Negro State Forest is located in the cool, moist mountains of the Cordillera Central. Mean annual temperature from 19.4 to 25 °C. Temperatures are unmistakably cooler at higher elevations. Average yearly temperature is 18.4 °C (65.12 °F).

Average annual precipitation of five weather stations in and surrounding the forest ranges from 203 to 292 cm. As much as 150 inches of annual rainfall has registered at Toro Negro.  The average annual rainfall is 110 inches. The months of September and May experience the most precipitation. A dry season runs from December through March. The months of June and July also tend to be dry.

Gallery of flora and fauna

Flora

Fauna

See also

 List of fauna at Toro Negro State Forest
 List of flora at Toro Negro State Forest
 List of Puerto Rico state forests
 Puerto Rican tody

Notes

References

Further reading
 "Puerto Rico Statewide Assessment and Strategies for Forest Resources". Government of Puerto Rico. Department of Natural and Environmental Resources. (n.d.; ca. 2011) 171 pages. 
 "Puerto Rico Statewide Assessment and Strategies for Forest Resources". Government of Puerto Rico. Department of Natural and Environmental Resources. (n.d.; ca. 2011) 100 pages.
 "Guide to the Ecological Systems of Puerto Rico". Gary L. Miller and Ariel E. Lugo. United States Department of Agriculture Forest Service. International Institute of Tropical Forestry. General Technical Report IITF-GTR-35. June 2009.
 Gould, W.A.; Alarcón, C.; Fevold, B.; Jiménez, M.E.; Martinuzzi, S.; Potts, G.; Solórzano, M.; Ventosa, E. Puerto Rico Gap Analysis Project–final report. Moscow, ID: U.S. Geological Survey, and Río Piedras, PR: U.S. Department of Agriculture, Forest Service, International Institute of Tropical Forestry. 159 pages and 8 appendices. 2007. 
 Volume 1: Land Cover, Vertebrate Species Distributions, and Land Stewardship. William A. Gould, Caryl Alarcón, Brick Fevold, Michael E. Jiménez, Sebastián Martinuzzi, Gary Potts, Maya Quiñones, Mariano Solórzano, and Eduardo Ventosa. The Puerto Rico Gap Analysis Project. (Publication Number: IITF-GTR-39) USDA. Forest Service. International Institute of Tropical Forestry. March 2008. Retrieved 18 August 2013.
 "Forest Area Trends in Puerto Rico". Richard A. Birdsey and Peter L. Weaver. USDA. Forest Service. Southern Forest Experiment Station. Research Note. SO-331. February 1987. Retrieved 15 August 2013.

External links

 Descriptions, General 
 "Bosque Estatal de Toro Negro" at PRFROGUI.com.
 Beaudon, Aaron. n.d. "Into the Forest; Toro Negro, Puerto Rico, Trekity: Daily Travel Ideas for Women (blog)
 Fauna and flora
 Tree Fern (foreground) and Palm forest (background) 
 Bird of the Month - September 2006, Reinita del Bosque Enano (Dendroica angelae; English: Elfin-woods Warbler).
 Maga - Montezuma eciosissima Sessé & Moc.
 Caribbean National Forest/Luquillo Experimental Forest.
 Frank Wadsworth: Tropical Research and Technology Transfer. Barry Walden Walsh.
 Puerto Rico Fishing Regulations.
 "Forest Legacy for Puerto Rico: An Assessment of Need". Puerto Rico Department of Natural and Environmental Resources. Forest Service Bureau. July 2000. 
 "Toro Negro Vegetation Map".
 Landmarks (Photos)
 Salto de Doña Juana (Doña Juana Falls) on PR-139
 Area de descanso (Rest Area) at Cerro Maravilla
 Cloud forest at Toro Negro on PR-143
 Another view of the Cloud Forest at Toro Negro on PR-143
 Bridge over PR-139 in Barrio Anon, Ponce, inside Toro Negro State Forest
 Doña Juana Creek flowing down towards Rio Toro Negro near PR-139
 Maps
 Driving maps
 "PR DRNA Fullscreen Map. Directions to Toro Negro".
 "PR DRNA Small Map. Directions to Toro Negro".
 Trail maps
 "Toro Negro State Forest Trail Map by the PR Department of Natural and Environmental Resources". 
 "Trail Map of Bosque Estatal de Toro Negro".
 "Color Trail Map".
 "Cerro de Punta Climb, Puerto Rico". (A Cerro de Punta climber's dairy)
 "OpenStreetMap". (An open source map of Toro Negro foot trails)
 Miscellaneous
 "Photo of Camino El Bolo trail".
 "General advice, tips, contacts, comments, etc."
 Trails (Photos)
 View of Toro Negro State Forest
 A section of Camino El Bolo (Trail #1) between Camino La Piscina (Trail #6) and the PR-561 terminus
 View of the town of Villalba from Camino El Bolo (Trail #1)
 Torre de Observacion (Observation Tower) Trail #3
 Lago Matrullas (Lake Matrullas) as seen from the Observation Tower on Trail #3
 Entryway and steps leading to the top of the Observation Tower on Trail #3 
 Doña Juana Creek as it rolls down next to Camino to Pool (Trail #6)
 A view of one of the Doña Juana Creek waterfalls next to Camino to Pool (Trail #6)
 "Dam" at natural pool area on Trail #6
 Area de Acampar (Camping Area), Trail #7
 Steps on part of Camino to Charco La Confesora (Trail #8)
 Doña Juana Creek near the campgrounds at Toro Negro, Trail #8
 Videos
 Hiking to the Roof of Puerto Rico: The Real Puerto Rico, Episode 2 (Hike to Cerro de Punta)
 Bosque de Toro Negro - Piscina de Agua Natural (Natural Swimming Pool)
 Sights in Toro Negro Forest (Trail to the Observation Tower)

Tourist attractions in Puerto Rico
Puerto Rico state forests
Geography of Ponce, Puerto Rico
1934 establishments in Puerto Rico
Jayuya, Puerto Rico
Juana Díaz, Puerto Rico
Villalba, Puerto Rico
Tourist attractions in Ponce, Puerto Rico
Puerto Rican moist forests
Protected areas established in 1934